Cuproxena latiana is a species of moth of the family Tortricidae. It is found in Venezuela and Ecuador (Napo Province).

References

Moths described in 1991
Cuproxena